Quincy is a rapid transit station on the Chicago "L" system. The station is located above the intersection of Quincy Street and Wells Street in downtown Chicago, Illinois. Having opened in 1897, it is one of the oldest surviving stations on the 'L' system.

History
Designed by Alfred M. Hedley from wood and stamped metal, Quincy opened on October 3, 1897. It retained much of its original surroundings over the years and is considered one of "150 great places in Illinois" by the American Institute of Architects. The station is located in the South Loop Financial District and is the closest CTA rail station to the Willis Tower, approximately one block west. It is also three blocks west of Union Station, which doubles as Chicago's Amtrak station and the downtown terminus for several Metra routes. Although the Clinton station on the Blue Line is closer (two blocks south), Quincy is the nearest stop on the Loop to Union Station.

Quincy is an elevated station, located above Quincy Street between Adams Street and Jackson Boulevard. It features two side platforms and station houses, one on the west to serve the Outer Loop track, and one on the east to serve the Inner Loop track. Turnstiles for fare payment are located in the station houses on the platform level.  The station once had a transfer bridge, but this was removed in the 1980s. This means it is not possible to change from one platform to the other without paying another fare or asking for employee assistance. There are auxiliary exits to both Adams and Jackson on the Inner Loop platform, while the Outer Loop only has an auxiliary exit to Adams. There are also auxiliary exits to the mezzanine level from both platforms, all using Rotogates. There is also a "slam" gate at each exit for emergencies only. Unlike most Chicago "L" stations, the "slam" gates do not appear to have alarms. Both platforms are designed to handle eight-car trains, the longest the CTA 'L' system can run.

A renovation project from 1985 to 1988 resulted in Quincy taking on a look similar to the look it had when it opened. Some materials such as signage were changed, although several of the station's features are original to its 1897 opening.

A renovation project began at the station in 2016 and was completed in December 2018. The renovation added two new elevators to the station to make it accessible for people with disabilities, and other improvements include new stairs and new lights. The station remained open during the project. The project was completed in December 2018.

Train services
In normal operation, the station is serviced by the Brown, Orange, and Pink Lines. During weekday rush hours, the Purple Line also stops here. Brown Line trains stop at the Outer Loop platform, while all other lines stop at the Inner Loop platform.

Bus connections

CTA
  1 Bronzeville/Union Station (Weekday Rush Hours only) 
  7 Harrison (Weekdays only) 
  28 Stony Island (Weekday Rush Hours only) 
  37 Sedgwick (Weekdays only)
  126 Jackson 
 134 Stockton/LaSalle Express (Weekday Rush Hours only) 
  135 Clarendon/LaSalle Express (Weekday Rush Hours only) 
  136 Sheridan/LaSalle Express (Weekday Rush Hours only) 
  151 Sheridan 
  156 LaSalle (Weekdays only)

Gallery

References

External links

 
 Quincy/Wells Station Page at Chicago-'L'.org

 Adams Street entrance from Google Maps Street View
 Quincy Street entrance from Google Maps Street View
 Jackson Boulevard entrance from Google Maps Street View

CTA Brown Line stations
CTA Orange Line stations
CTA Purple Line stations
CTA Pink Line stations
Historic American Engineering Record in Chicago
Railway stations in the United States opened in 1897
Former North Shore Line stations